Viktor Nikolayevich Liina (born 19 July 1968) is an officer of the Russian Navy. He holds the rank of admiral, and is currently serving as Commander in Chief of the Baltic Fleet.

Career
Liina was born on 19 June 1968 in Pechory, Pskov Oblast, then part of the Russian Soviet Federative Socialist Republic, in the Soviet Union. Beginning as an engineer in the electronic navigation department of a cruiser submarine, he rose through the ranks to eventually command a nuclear submarine. From 1999 to 2004 he was commander of the 74th "Segezha" crew of the Northern Fleet's 11th Submarine Division.

On 9 August 2012 Liina was promoted to the rank of kontr-admiral. This was followed with a posting as commander of Northeastern Group of Troops and Forces in December 2012.

In 2014 Liina enrolled in the Military Academy of the General Staff of the Armed Forces of Russia, and on graduating in 2016, was appointed First Deputy Commander of the Black Sea Fleet in May that year. On 12 December 2018 Liina was promoted to the rank of vice-admiral and on 1 August 2019 he took up the role of Deputy Chief of the General Staff of the Armed Forces of the Russian Federation.  In this capacity in July 2020 he led the General Staff's control group on an inspection of the Black Sea Fleet before the upcoming strategic command and staff exercises "Caucasus 2020". On 18 May 2020 he presented diplomas to graduates of the NBC Protection Military Academy.

On 5 October 2021 Liina was appointed Commander of the Baltic Fleet. He was promoted to the rank of admiral on 7 December 2022.

Over his career Liina has received the Orders of Nakhimov, Military Merit and Naval Merit, as well as various medals.

References 

1968 births
Living people
People from Pechory
Soviet Navy personnel
Russian admirals
Recipients of the Order of Nakhimov
Recipients of the Order of Military Merit (Russia)
Recipients of the Order of Naval Merit (Russia)
Recipients of the Medal of Zhukov
N. G. Kuznetsov Naval Academy alumni
Military Academy of the General Staff of the Armed Forces of Russia alumni